Harold P. Pruett (April 13, 1969 – February 21, 2002) was an American film and television actor. He appeared in over 30 films and TV series in the 1970s to the 1990s.

Career
Born in Anchorage, Alaska, Pruett made his acting debut at age five in the 1976 film Sybil, starring Sally Field. He went on to appear in Summer Camp Nightmare (1987), Embrace of the Vampire (1995) and Precious Find (1996).

During the 1970s and 1980s, Pruett guest starred on numerous television series including Wonder Woman, The New Leave It to Beaver, It's Your Move, Eye to Eye, The Best Times, Hotel and Night Court. In the late 1980s and early 1990s, he danced in several music videos including two for the pop singer Martika, "More Than You Know" (1989) and "Coloured Kisses" (1992).

In 1990, Pruett had his first co-starring television role on the NBC musical teen drama Hull High. Due to low ratings, the series was canceled in October 1990 after nine episodes. Later that year, he was cast as Steve Randle in the television adaptation of the 1967 S. E. Hinton novel The Outsiders, shown on Fox. That series was also canceled after one season because of low ratings. From 1992 to 1993, he had a recurring role as Brad Penny on the teen sitcom Parker Lewis. In 1995, he co-starred on another short lived Fox series, Medicine Ball. His last television appearance was in a recurring role on the Fox teen drama series Party of Five, in 1996. Pruett's final film appearance was in the independent drama The Right Way (1998), starring Geoff Pierson.

Death
On February 21, 2002, Pruett died of an accidental drug overdose in Los Angeles. His funeral was held at Hollywood Forever Cemetery, where he was interred. Pruett was survived by his wife, Jennifer Cattell, his son Tannen, his parents Andrea and Harold, and a brother.

Pruett's mother and friends created the Harold Pruett Drug Abuse Foundation in his memory.

Filmography

Films

Television

References

External links
 
 

1969 births
2002 deaths
20th-century American male actors
21st-century American male actors
Accidental deaths in California
American male child actors
American male dancers
American male film actors
American male television actors
Burials at Hollywood Forever Cemetery
Drug-related deaths in California
Male actors from Anchorage, Alaska
20th-century American dancers